The 1947 Western Reserve Red Cats football team represented the Western Reserve University in the American city of Cleveland, Ohio, now known as Case Western Reserve University, during the 1947 college football season.  The Red Cats were a member of the Mid-American Conference (MAC).

The team was coached by Tom Davies, who was fired and replaced by assistant coach Dick Luther beginning game six.

Schedule

References

Western Reserve
Case Western Reserve Spartans football seasons
Western Reserve Red Cats football